Canalta Hotels is a hotel chain in western Canada with 44 hotels in Alberta, Saskatchewan and Manitoba.  The family owned company is based out of Drumheller and primarily targets smaller towns in Western Canada catering to sports teams, weddings, meetings and work crews.

In addition to operating hotels under the Canalta hotel brand the company also owns two Hampton Inn & Suites and one Best Western Plus. Canalta Hotels also has rights to the Ramada brand in Alberta and Saskatchewan.

In addition to hotels, the Canalta Group also operates 57 restaurants under the A&W Express banner in rural Alberta/Saskatchewan, 13 Boston Pizza franchises in Alberta, and 1 location under the in-house brand O'Shea's Eatery and Ale House.

Hotel Locations
 Alberta
Airdrie  (Ramada)
Banff (Canalta)
Brooks (Ramada and Canalta)
Camrose (Ramada and Canalta)
Cochrane (Ramada)
Drayton Valley (Ramada)
Drumheller (Canalta Jurassic, Ramada and Sure Stay)
Grande Prairie (Hampton Inn & Suites)
Hanna (Canalta)
High River (Ramada)
Lac La Biche (Canalta and Ramada)
Medicine Hat (Hampton Inn & Suites)
Olds (Ramada)
Oyen (Canalta)
Pincher Creek (Ramada)
Ponoka (Canalta)
Provost (Canalta)
Rimbey (Canalta)
Rocky Mountain House (Canalta)
St. Paul (Canalta and The Landing)
Stettler (Canalta and Ramada)
Wainwright (Ramada)
Westlock (Ramada)
 Saskatchewan
 Assiniboia (Canalta)
 Humboldt (Canalta)
 Esterhazy (Canalta)
 Kindersley (Canalta)
 Melfort(Canalta)
 Martensville (Canalta)
Moosomin (Canalta)
Shaunavon (Canalta)
Tisdale (Canalta)
 Weyburn (Canalta and Ramada) 
 Manitoba
 Brandon (Best Western Plus)
 Selkirk (Canalta)

References

External links
Canalta Hotels
O’Shea’s Eatery and Ale House
Canalta Group

Hotel chains in Canada
Hotel and leisure companies of Canada